The Minckley's cichlid (Herichthys minckleyi) is a species of fish in the family Cichlidae. It is endemic to Cuatro Ciénegas in Coahuila, Mexico. The specific name honours the ichthyologist Wendell L. Minckley (1935-2001) of Arizona State University who studied the ecology of Cuatro Ciénegas.

References

Minckley's cichlid
Endemic fish of Mexico
Freshwater fish of Mexico
Cuatrociénegas Municipality
Natural history of Coahuila
Cichlid fish of North America
Endangered fish
Endangered biota of Mexico
Fish described in 1983
Taxonomy articles created by Polbot